Amata trigonophora is a moth of the subfamily Arctiinae first described by Alfred Jefferis Turner in 1898. It is found in the coastal areas of eastern Australia.

References

trigonophora
Moths of Australia
Moths described in 1898